Antarala (Sanskrit: अन्तराल, lit. intermediate space) is a small antechamber or foyer between  the garbhagriha (shrine) and the mandapa, more typical of north Indian temples.

Antarala are commonly seen in Chalukyan Style temples in which the 'Vimana' and the 'Mandapa' are connected through the 'Antarala'.

Notes

Hindu temple architecture